Arturo Berutti (c. 27 March 1862 in San Juan, Argentina - 3 January 1938 in Buenos Aires) was an Argentinian composer of classical music and librettos. He was best known for his notable theme Pampa (1897). The opera was based on the life of Juan Moreira. One of the influential Argentinian opera composers of the late 19th and early 20th century and his music was influenced by the Italian opera. In 1895, he composed the opera Taras Bulba inspired on the novel by Nikolai Gogol.

Life
He was born on 14 March 1858 or on 27 March 1862 in San Juan, Argentina. Berutti studied law in Buenos Aires. Thanks to his winning talent in 1884, with scholarship at the music stadium and he was able to study in Europe. He began his education at the Leipzig Conservatory with Carl Reinecke and Salomon Jadassohn and later studied in Paris, France, in 1889 and Milan, Italy, by 1890, where he was interested with the lyrics in Italian and in 1892, he composed his first classical operas Vendetta and Evangelina. He returned to his native Argentina in 1896 to focus on his composition work of writing various operas, the mostly on under his South American libretto issues. He was a pioneer of Argentine lyrics. He was also a music professor of Gilardo Gilardi Conservatory of Music, where he studied with him in Buenos Aires. He was also of his predominant production lyrics, what in much cases combined issues of Argentine folklore music. Berutti composed including with symphony, sonata and songs. Between his script highlights the treaty translation of the harmony of Salomon Jadassohn. Berutti died on 3 January 1938, aged 76 or 80 in Buenos Aires.

Felipe Boero was one of his students.

Works 
 Vendetta, opera, 1892.
 Evangelina, opera based on the novel by Henry Wadsworth Longfellow, 1893.
 Taras Bulba, opera based on the novel by Nikolai Gogol, 1895.
 Pampa, opera about Juan Moreira, by Eduardo Gutiérrez, 1897.
 Yupanki, opera on by Vicente Fidel López, 1899.
 Khrysé, opera with libretto based on the novel by Pierre Louÿs Afrodita, 1902.
 Nox horrida, opera, 1908.
 Gli Eroi, opera with libretto by Vicente Fidel López, 1919.

Further reading 
 Juan María Veniard: Arturo Berutti. Un argentino en el mundo de la Ópera, Institute National of Musicology "Carlos Vega", Buenos Aires 1988,

Notes

External links 
  Conferencia III jornadas de ópera argentina
  Clásicos argentinos
 Biography on Classical composer database

1862 births
1938 deaths
Argentine opera composers
19th-century classical composers
20th-century classical composers
Argentine academics
Date of birth unknown
Male classical composers
Opera librettists
People from San Juan, Argentina
People from Buenos Aires
Romantic composers
Argentine people of Italian descent
20th-century male musicians
19th-century male musicians
19th-century musicians